Steven Christopher Koutsis is an American diplomat has served as the Chargé d’Affaires of Guinea between 2020-2022. He is the former nominee be the United States Ambassador to Chad.

Early life and education 

Koutsis earned a Bachelor of Arts from Boston University in 1979.

Career 
Koutsis is a career member of the Senior Foreign Service, class of Minister Counselor. His diplomatic career has involve roles as the Director of the Office of the Special Envoy for Sudan and South Sudan, Deputy Chief of Mission in Ouagadougou, Burkina Faso, and Deputy Director in the Office of Central African Affairs. Prior assignments include service as Team Leader of the Provincial Reconstruction Team in Diyala Province, Iraq, Political and Economic Counselor in Monrovia, Liberia, and Deputy Chief of Mission in Nouakchott, Mauritania. Most recently, from 2016 to 2019, he served as the Charge d’Affaires of the United States Embassy in Khartoum, Sudan. Koutsis became Chargé d’Affaires for Guinea in September 2020.

On July 24, 2019, he was nominated to be the next United States Ambassador to Chad. On August 1, 2020, his nomination was sent to the Senate. On January 3, 2021, his nomination was returned to the President under Rule XXXI, Paragraph 6 of the United States Senate.

Personal life 
Koutsis speaks French and Arabic.

References

Living people
21st-century American diplomats
Ambassadors of the United States to Sudan
Boston University alumni
United States Foreign Service personnel
Year of birth missing (living people)
Place of birth missing (living people)